Lakes Creek is a  long 1st order tributary to the Uwharrie River, in Randolph County, North Carolina.

Course
Lakes Creek rises in a pond on the Duncombe Creek divide about 0.25 miles north of Eleazer, North Carolina in Randolph County, North Carolina.  Lakes Creek then flows west to meet the Uwharrie River about 3 miles southeast of Pinson.

Watershed
Lakes Creek drains  of area, receives about 47.4 in/year of precipitation, has a topographic wetness index of 322.46 and is about 88% forested.

See also
List of rivers of North Carolina

References

Rivers of North Carolina
Rivers of Randolph County, North Carolina